Al Qiyadah  is a rapid transit station on the Green Line of the Dubai Metro in Dubai, UAE.

The station opened as part of the Green Line on 9 September 2011. It has a capacity to handle 11,000 passengers per hour in each direction. The station is located on Al Ittihad Road between the districts of Al Twar and Hor Al Anz.

The station located on Al Ittihad Road and is close to the Al Mulla Plaza and Dubai Police General Headquarters.

References

Railway stations in the United Arab Emirates opened in 2011
Dubai Metro stations